Porostov is a village and municipality in the Sobrance District in the Košice Region of east Slovakia.

History
In historical records the village was first mentioned in 1412.

Geography
The village lies at an altitude of 107 metres and covers an area of 7.298 km2.
It has a population of about 335 people.

Culture
The village has a public library and a soccer pitch.

References

External links
 
http://www.slovakregion.sk/porostov
http://en.e-obce.sk/obec/porostov/porostov.html

Villages and municipalities in Sobrance District